Boogie Wings (known in Japan as ) is a horizontally scrolling shooter released in arcades by Data East in 1992. The game was never ported to home systems.

Gameplay

The game is set around the time of World War I, where the player maneuvers biplanes, automobiles, animals, and various other unidentifiable objects to battle an army of mech-wielding scientists. One of the game's bosses is a giant robot Santa Claus.

The player uses the 8-way joystick to control the biplane's movements, and the 2 buttons to shoot or hook enemies. The biggest characteristic of the player's biplane is the hook attached to its rear section. The hook is also controlled by the joystick, and enemies or objects that come in contact with the hook are dragged along by the plane. Dragged objects cause damage to anything they collide with, and the player can release the objects on the hook by pressing the hook button again. Dragged objects are destroyed when the player releases them from the hook, or if they collide enough times to break apart.

The ship's power gauge increases when the player taps the shot button rapidly, and filling up the gauge causes the plane to shoot a bolt of lightning that covers a large area of the screen. However, the plane overheats if the player taps the shot button too many times, so this attack must be used sparingly.

The game's graphics are highly detailed, and many of the backgrounds are likened to European towns and cities or World's fair-like scenes. Many of the game's background objects can also be destroyed or dragged around with the hook.

Vehicles
Though the player's main vehicle is the biplane, they can still continue on foot if their plane is shot down. The player can attack with a handgun while on foot, and can also ride various vehicles found along the way to make the progress easier. The vehicles include various animals such as giraffes, elephants, and horses, pogo sticks, bicycles, motorcycles, jeeps, and several types of robots that can hop and shoot missiles. Though the biplane is by far the most effective unit in terms of game completion, the presence of the ground units adds another layer of amusement to the game.

Development
Rohga: Armor Force was developed and released in Japan by Data East a year prior to Boogie Wings, and the vehicles in Boogie Wings were derived from the gameplay in Rohga: Armor Force, where the player could continue on foot even after their robot was destroyed.

References

External links
Boogie Wings at Arcade History

1992 video games
Arcade video games
Arcade-only video games
Christmas video games
Data East video games
Horizontally scrolling shooters
Video games developed in Japan
Data East arcade games
Multiplayer and single-player video games